The 980s BC is a decade which lasted from 989 BC to 980 BC.

Events and trends
 984 BC—Osorkon the Elder succeeds Amenemope as king of Egypt.
 0982 BC—The end of first period (1197 BC–982 BC) by Sau Yung's concept of the I Ching and history.
 c.980 BC—The kingdom of Dʿmt is founded in Eritrea and northern Ethiopia.